Nurga is a village in Põltsamaa Parish, Jõgeva County in eastern Estonia.

References

 

Villages in Jõgeva County